The 2012-2013 Basketball Championship of Bosnia and Herzegovina is the 12th season of the Basketball Championship of Bosnia and Herzegovina, with 12 teams from Bosnia participating in it.

Regular season will start on October 20, 2012, and it will last until March 23, 2013.

Current season teams (2012–2013)

Locations

Regular season

Standings

Schedule and results

Liga 6

Standings

P=Matches played, W=Matches won, L=Matches lost, F=Points for, A=Points against, D=Points difference, Pts=Points

Schedule and results

Playoff stage

Semifinals
Game 1

Game 2

Final
Game 1

Game 2

Bracket

Stats leaders

Points

Rebounds

Assists

Ranking MVP

MVP Round by Round

Liga 12

Liga 6

Play off

References

Basketball Championship of Bosnia and Herzegovina
Bosnia
Basketball